Amir ol Omara (also Romanized as Amīr ol Omarā’ and Amīral Omarā; also known as Amīr ol Amar) is a village in Samen Rural District, Samen District, Malayer County, Hamadan Province, Iran. At the 2006 census, its population was 191, in 64 families.

References 

Populated places in Malayer County